Sleep, My Love is a 1948 American noir film directed by Douglas Sirk. It features Claudette Colbert, Robert Cummings and Don Ameche.

Plot
Alison Courtland, a wealthy New Yorker, hasn't a clue how she ended up on a train bound for Boston. When she phones her husband, Richard, the police listen in and overhear that she had threatened him with a gun. On a flight home, fellow passenger Bruce Elcott is attracted to Alison. Elcott, it turns out, knows one of her good friends.

Back home, Richard makes Alison agree to start seeing a psychiatrist, Dr. Rhinehart. However, the 'Doctor' who shows up at the house for their first appointment is not Rhinehart, but Charles Vernay, a photographer hired by Richard, who is having an affair with another woman, Daphne, and hopes to get rid of Alison for good.

Richard's scheme is to drive Alison to suicide and thus inherit her wealth. Elcott, who has come to suspect there is some kind of purposeful plan afoot to confuse and distress Alison, arrives just in time to find her, apparently under hypnosis, about to leap from a balcony to her death. Elcott discovers Vernay's role in the situation. Richard, meanwhile, attempts to drug Alison and make her kill the doctor herself.

Vernay realizes he has been betrayed and  shoots Richard; Vernay is later killed by falling through a skylight while being chased by Elcott, after which Elcott and Alison are able to be together in peace.

Cast
 Claudette Colbert as Alison Courtland
 Robert Cummings as Bruce Elcott
 Don Ameche as Richard Courtland
 Rita Johnson as Barby
 George Coulouris as Charles Vernay
 Queenie Smith as Mrs. Grace Vernay
 Ralph Morgan as Dr. Rhinehart
 Keye Luke as Jimmie Lin
 Fred Nurney as Haskins
 Raymond Burr as Detective Sgt. Strake
 Hazel Brooks as Daphne
 Edgar Dearing as Hannigan (uncredited)

Production
The film was based on a story by Leo Rosten which had been serialised in magazines. In November 1946 the screen rights were bought by Triangle Productions, a company consisting of Mary Pickford, husband Buddy Rogers and Ralph Cohn. It was Pickford's first film in twelve years - her last was The Gay Desperado - although Cohn and Rogers had produced films for Comet Productions. Pickford was involved in approving the cast and script.

Rosten wrote the first script, and in December the production company approached Richard Ney to head the cast.

In April 1947 Don Ameche signed to star and Douglas Sirk agreed to direct, then Colbert and Cummings were added to the cast.

Filming started on 27 May 1947 at the Hal Roach Studios in Los Angeles.

Release
Sleep My Love premiered on 27 January 1948. Olive Films released it on Blu-ray on April 15, 2014.

Reception
The world premiere of the film was in Ottawa, as a benefit to help children in Europe.

The reviewer for Variety wrote of the film, "Sleep, My Love manages a fair share of suspense and adds up to okay melodrama. Plot gets off to a strong start and windup is high melodrama that brings off the finale on a fast note." The New York Times reviewer described it as "a sleek entry which manages to run its course without coming a cropper". Glenn Kenny wrote on RogerEbert.com that despite miscasting issues, "Sirk applies so much visual brio to the proceedings, and supporting players George Coulouris and Hazel Brook are so compelling, it's very easy to watch anyway." Jonathan Rosenbaum of the Chicago Reader called it "a minor Douglas Sirk thriller, better in atmospherics than story logic". Chuck Bowen of Slant Magazine rated it 2.5/5 stars and wrote, "Sleep, My Love is a self-conscious homage to a variety of its contemporary thriller brethren, most obviously Suspicion and Gaslight, and it's often characterized by competent, derivative efficiency at the expense of true dread or spontaneity." Michael Barrett of PopMatters rated it 6/10 stars and criticized the plot device, gaslighting, as turning female protagonists into "the most frustratingly obtuse idiots in the world".

See also
 Gothic romance film
 Gaslighting

References

External links
 
 
 
 
 Sleep, My Love informational site and DVD review at DVD Beaver (includes images)
 Sleep My Love at Letterbox DVD

1948 films
1948 drama films
American drama films
American black-and-white films
Film noir
United Artists films
Films directed by Douglas Sirk
1940s English-language films
1940s American films